Events in the year 1884 in Mexico.

Incumbents 
 President – Manuel González Flores until November 30, Porfirio Díaz from December 1
 Archbishop of Mexico – Pelagio Antonio de Labastida y Dávalos

Governors
 Aguascalientes: Rafael Arellano Ruíz Esparza
 Campeche: Juan Montalvo
 Chiapas: José María Ramírez
 Chihuahua: Luis Terrazas/Ramón Cuéllar Aranda/Celso González Esquivel/Carlos Pacheco Villalobos/Carlos Fuero
 Coahuila: Blas Rodríguez Farías/Francisco de Paula Ramos/Praxedis de la Peña García
 Colima: Esteban García
 Durango:  
 Guanajuato: 
 Guerrero: 
 Hidalgo: 
 Jalisco: Francisco Tolentino/Maximiano Valdovinos
 State of Mexico:  
 Michoacán: 
 Morelos: Carlos Quaglia Zimbrón
 Nuevo León: Canuto García
 Oaxaca: 
 Puebla: 
 Querétaro: Rafael Olvera Ledesma
 San Luis Potosí: Carlos Díez Gutiérrez
 Sinaloa: 
 Sonora: 
 Tabasco: 
 Tamaulipas: Romulo Cuellar
 Tlaxcala: 	 
 Veracruz: José Cortés Frías/Juan de la Luz Enríquez Lara
 Yucatán: General Octavio Rosado
 Zacatecas:

Events
 June 2 – Banamex was formed from the merger of Banco Nacional Mexicano and Banco Mercantil Mexicano, two banks that had operated since the beginning of 1882.
 December 1 – Porfirio Díaz becomes president of Mexico for the second time after winning the elections.
 December 18 – The Territory of Nayarit is formed once its territorial limits with Jalisco were established.

Popular culture

Sports

Music

Literature

Notable births 
January 11 — Clara Oriol de la Huerta, First Lady of Mexico (1920) (d. 1967)

Dates unknown 
 José Fondevila García was born in Pontevedra province Spain (died 1973)
 José Inés Salazar, fought in the Mexican Revolution was born in Casas Grandes, Chihuahua (died 1917)

Notable deaths

References 

 
Years of the 19th century in Mexico